The main broadcaster of Indian Super League in India and the Indian subcontinent is Star Sports Network on television. Disney+ Hotstar and JioTV are official streaming partners in India and the Indian subcontinent. Indian Super League is also aired live on TV with regional languages in various regional channels of Star Network portfolio. The live coverage of the ISL is available in more than 80 territories across the world. FSDL on 25 November 2021, announced a worldwide partnership with German football media company, OneFootball to broadcast the Indian Super League (ISL) in over 200 countries across the globe (excluding the Indian Subcontinent).

National & regional broadcasters

Note:
 1) All the above mentioned channels come under the portfolio of Star India.
 2)  Hindi (on Star Sports 1 Hindi) & English (on Star Sports 2) are aired nationally. 
 3)  Bengali, Malayalam, Kannada, Tamil, Telugu are aired on respective regional channels as well as on Star Sports 3 respectively with regional audio feeds.

Overseas broadcasters

Current broadcasters

Source: Indian Super League

Previous broadcasters

Period (2018–2019)

Period (2019–2021)

Source:

References

broadcasters
Super League
Lists of association football broadcasters